Chantimelle is a town in Saint Patrick Parish, Grenada.  It is located at the northern end of the island.

References

Populated places in Grenada